Raja Jang , is a town and Union Council of Kasur District in the Punjab province of Pakistan. It is part of Kasur Tehsil. Its population is over 100,000. It is situated at a higher altitude than Lahore. The BRB Canal passes the north-west side of the town.

History
The name Raja Jang is a variation of Raja Roy Bahadur Jang. Raja Roy Bahadur Jang lived in Raja Jang under British rule. After 1947, Sikhs and Hindus left behind havelis and mansions. RajaJang is the only town of Kasur district with high literacy.

Festivals
The main festivals are the Urs of Baba Masoom Shah, Baba Fateh Shah, Baba Khaki shah, and Baba Lal Shahbaz. The Muslim population shows great interest in celebrating Eid UL Fitr, Eid UL Azha, Eid Melad and Nabi. Urus of Baba Masoom Shah, Fateh Shah, and Lal Shahbaz is a famous festival.

Sports
Rassa Kashi (Tug of war) is the major sports item. H/S Raja Jang was the divisional champion of Rassa Kashi until the 1990s in the regime of headmaster Muhammad Aslam Ch. Rassa Kashi team was prepared by Mian Amanat Ali Saheb. Master Malik Muhammad Rafeeq was in charge of the football team and struggled to make the team competitive. Raja Jang has many teams playing football and cricket, which hold local sports competitions annually.  Hockey is popular.

References

Kasur District
Union councils of Kasur District